Zachary High School is a public high school located in Zachary, Louisiana, United States. It is a part of the Zachary Community School Board.

History
Zachary High School was established in 1912. It was segregated. The Rosenwald Fund helped establish a school for African Americans, Zacahry Colored School, in 1934, but there was no public high school open to African Americans in Zachary until 1954. Zachary High School desegregated in the 1970s.

Zachary High School was within the East Baton Rouge Parish School System. In 2002, Zachary High School became part of the Zachary Community School District. Since the break from East Baton Rouge Parish, the Zachary High School campus has been renovated. Zachary High School now has a newly built freshman academy, gym, ROTC building, Industrial Arts Building, agriscience complex, Academic Athletic Center, and Hard Work Cafe. Zachary High school also has a stadium with an artificial turf field that holds five thousand people.

Academics
Three teachers at the school were named Louisiana Teacher of the Year. Mrs. Cathy Raziano, who was selected as Louisiana's 2003-2004 Teacher of the Year, Dr. Carol Price, a math teacher, was honored as 2007-2008 Teacher of the Year, and Mrs. Britni Matthews, an English honors teacher who was honored as Louisiana's 2020-2021 Teacher of the Year.

The class of 2010 was the first to be initiated into the "Freshman Academy." The Freshman Academy is designed to help freshman successfully develop and adapt to high school work and life.

Zachary High School is one of three high schools in Louisiana to have the Oracle Computer Database Building program, which costs over $3000. Neighboring and rival school, West Feliciana High School, located in St. Francisville, LA, also has the Oracle Computer Database Building Program.

Athletics
Zachary High athletes compete in varsity level sports in the LHSAA. 

Sports include baseball, softball, boys' and girls' track and field, boys' and girls' cross country, boys' and girls' soccer, golf, bowling, swimming, wrestling, boys' and girls' basketball, boys' and girls' weightlifting, football, tennis, and volleyball.

Baseball
Zachary baseball was 2013 state runner-up under Coach Jesse Cassard.

Girls' cross country
ZHS girls' cross country won district championships in 2005, 2006, 2007, and 2008.

Football

The Zachary High football team has won four State Championships in: 2015, 2017, 2018, 2021.

The Zachary High football team was under Coach Neil Weiner from 2009 to 2013. He turned the team around from a 3-7 record in his first season in 2009 to a 12-3 record the following season in 2010 and was also District 5-5A co-champions. 

David Brewerton has been head coach since 2014. In his first season, he coached Zachary to a 14-1 record. He also coached Zachary to 2015, 2017, 2018 and 2021 5A state championships including an undefeated 15-0 record in 2021.

Boys' soccer
The boys' soccer team was 2007 6-4A District runner-up and advanced to the quarterfinals of the state tournament.

Band
The wind ensemble was selected to play at Carnegie Hall at the 2007 National Youth Concert. The "Band of Blue" has played at the BGA Peach Bowl, the BGA Sugar Bowl, 2013 Outback Bowl, and at the National Independence Day Parade in Washington, D.C. Individual musicians have been selected to play in All-South, All-State (concert and jazz), All-District, All-Parish (concert and jazz), and Ark-La-Tex.  Individual musicians have also been selected to participate in the High School Honors Performance Series at Carnegie Hall and the High School Honors Performance Series at Sydney Opera House. The Zachary High School Band has been honored for their outstanding performances at the district concert and state concert series throughout the years. They compete annually in the Northwestern State University and Dutchtown High School marching festivals. The jazz band competes annually at Loyola University.  The Zachary High Concert Band was honored with the Golden Mickey as the best band at the 2019 Festival Disney.  The Zachary High Band Colorguard competes in the Winter Guard Series.

References

External links

 SchoolTree.org Zachary High School
 Zachary High School website
 District website
 School review

Public high schools in Louisiana
Schools in East Baton Rouge Parish, Louisiana